Leslie Minnett (19 May 1883 – 8 August 1934) was an Australian cricketer. He played ten first-class matches for New South Wales between 1907/08 and 1914/15.

See also
 List of New South Wales representative cricketers

References

External links
 

1883 births
1934 deaths
Australian cricketers
New South Wales cricketers
Cricketers from Sydney